The Sudan National Petroleum Corporation, also known as Sudapet, is a state-owned oil company based in Sudan.  It was founded in 1997 and is 100% owned by the Ministry for Energy and Mining (later the Ministry of Petroleum and Gas).

As a NOC, Sudapet has equities varying from 5% to 70% in the licensed petroleum concessions in Sudan with other foreign shareholders, in addition to a large range of petroleum associated services subsidiaries.
From 2006 to 2015, Sudapet is not active in oil exploitation, but rather serves to manage revenues the Sudanese government receives from its concessions to foreign operators.  At the same time there have been efforts within the government and among the company's principles to develop the resources and know-how to transform Sudapet into a fully self-sufficient enterprise in the oil exploitation space.

History 
In November 1997, the United States imposed sanctions against Sudan on the basis that profits from oil were being used to fuel the civil war. In February 2000, the US government extended its sanctions to include Sudapet and the Greater Nile Petroleum Operating Company (GNPOC). This was a contentious move in that Canadian international Talisman Energy was a 25% shareholder in GNPOC.
Later in September 2017, the United States lifted long-standing economic sanctions against Sudan.

Projects 
The company is a minority stakeholder in all of its exploitation and development projects.  Its activities break down as follows:

Acronyms:
CNPCIS:renamed to 'Petro Energy E & P' 
GNPOC:Greater Nile Petroleum Operating Company
PDOC:Petrodar Operating Company
WNPOC:White Nile Petroleum Operating Company
Sudapak:Sudapak Industrial Corporation
APCO:Advanced Petroleum Company
RSPOC:Red Sea Petroleum Operating Company
CPOC:Coral Petroleum Operating Company
GSPOC:Great Sahara Petroleum Operating Company
BNPOC:Blue Nile Petroleum Operating Company
ASE:Al-Sudan Energia Petroleum Operating Company
SOPOC:Star Oil Petroleum Operating Company
RPOC:Rawat Petroleum Operating Company

See also
Sudan Khartoum Refinery Company

Resources

External links 
Official Website
Advanced Petroleum company (APCO) official site

Oil and gas companies of Sudan
Companies based in Khartoum
National oil and gas companies
Government of Sudan
1997 establishments in Sudan
Non-renewable resource companies established in 1997
Energy companies established in 1997